Phalaenopsis wilsonii, also known as 华西蝴蝶兰 (hua xi hu die lan) in Chinese, is a species of epiphyte in the family Orchidaceae, native to China, Tibet, Myanmar and Vietnam. Additionally it has been recorded in India.

Description
The 1 cm long stems produce 4-5 oblong to subelliptic, 6.5-8 cm long and 2.6-3 cm wide leaves and greenish, well developed, dorsiventrally flattened, verrucose roots. The leaves often show purple colouration of the abaxial surface and they are shed before flowering, but sometimes 1-2 leaves persist. Flowering occurs throughout April to July. Widely and simultaneously opening, pink flowers are produced on 1-2 suberect or arching, 10-15 flowered racemes.
The plants are epiphytes or lithophytes on damp rock found at elevations of 800-2200m a.s.l. 
The chromosome count is 2n = 2x = 36.

Taxonomy
This species is placed within the subgenus Aphyllae, which is characterised by deciduous leaflessness. A source of taxonomic confusion has been the missapplication of this species name to Phalaenopsis honghenensis. Phylogenetic analysis indicated Phalaenopsis wilsonii was closely related to Phalaenopsis lowii.

Conservation
This species has been categorized as vulnerable in China Species Red List. It is protected unter the CITES appendix II regulations of international trade.

References

wilsonii
Orchids of Myanmar
Orchids of India
Orchids of Vietnam
Orchids of China
Plants described in 1909
Taxa named by Robert Allen Rolfe